Will House may refer to:

Places
in the United States (by state)
Louis Will House, Syracuse, New York, listed on the National Register of Historic Places (NRHP) in New York
H. P. Will House, Wessington Springs, South Dakota, listed on the NRHP in South Dakota

Person
 Will House (cricketer), an English cricketer